Tatyana Ivanovna Shmyga (born 31 December 1928 – died 3 February 2011) was a Soviet and Russian operetta/musical theatre performer. She went on to act in films as well. She was a People's Artist of the USSR (1978).

Moscow-born Shmyga graduated from the Lunacharsky State Institute for Theatre Arts, where she studied voice under Dora Borisovna Beliavskaia and acting under Joseph Mikhailovich Tumanov, later becoming a soloist with the Moscow Operetta Theater the same year. She began acting in films in 1962, notably appearing in Eldar Ryazanov's The Hussar Ballad.

Awards
Shmyga remains the only musical theatre actress to date to receive the title of People's Artist of the USSR. She also received the M.I. Glinka State Prize of the RSFSR in 1974, the Order of the Badge of Honor and several other medals.

Personal life
She was married three times: 
 television journalist Rudolf Borecki
 musical director Vladimir Kandelaki
 composer Anatoly Kremer

Death
Shmyga died in Moscow, aged 82, from vascular disease.

References

External links
 Страница Татьяны Шмыги на сайте Московского театра оперетты
 Фотогалерея Татьяны Шмыги на сайте «Мастера музыкального театра»

1928 births
2011 deaths
Actresses from Moscow
Russian film actresses
Soviet women singers
Soviet film actresses
People's Artists of the USSR
Singers from Moscow
20th-century Russian women singers
20th-century Russian singers
Recipients of the Order "For Merit to the Fatherland", 3rd class
People's Artists of the RSFSR
Honored Artists of the RSFSR
Russian Academy of Theatre Arts alumni